Salvador García Puig (born 4 March 1961), commonly known as Salva, is a Spanish retired footballer who played as a defender.

Club career
Born in Sant Adrià de Besòs, Barcelona, Catalonia, Salva finished his formation with FC Barcelona. In his professional career, he played for FC Barcelona B, Real Zaragoza, Hércules CF, Barcelona (three years in which he was solely a backup) and CD Logroñés, retiring at the age of 31 with 156 La Liga matches to his credit in ten seasons.

Salva's best output for the Blaugrana consisted of 17 games in the 1987–88 campaign, which ended with conquest of the Copa del Rey.

International career
Salva earned six caps for Spain, during less than one year. His debut came on 5 October 1983 in a friendly with France in Paris, and he was picked for the squad at UEFA Euro 1984 in which he played in three matches for the runners-up, including the final.

Honours

Club
Barcelona
Copa del Rey: 1987–88
Copa de la Liga: 1986

International
Spain
UEFA European Championship: Runner-up 1984

References

External links

1961 births
Living people
People from Barcelonès
Spanish footballers
Footballers from Catalonia
Association football defenders
La Liga players
Segunda División B players
FC Barcelona Atlètic players
Real Zaragoza players
FC Barcelona players
Hércules CF players
CD Logroñés footballers
Spain international footballers
UEFA Euro 1984 players
Sportspeople from the Province of Barcelona